Two ships of the Royal New Zealand Navy (RNZN) have been named HMNZS Wakakura:

 , transferred to the RNZN in 1941, was a  minesweeper. She served for New Zealand in the Second World War. Sold and converted to a merchant ship in 1947, becoming the SS Wakakura

Royal New Zealand Navy ship names